MasterChef Thailand is the Thai version of the competitive reality TV series MasterChef which premiered on Channel 7 on February 4, 2018.

Contestants

Elimination table

 (WINNER) This cook won the competition.
 (RUNNER-UP) This cook finished in second place.
 (WIN) The cook won an individual challenge (Mystery box challenge or Invention Test).
 (WIN) The cook won an individual challenge (Pressure Test) and was announced by the judges.
 (WIN) The cook was on the winning team in the Team challenge and directly advanced to the next round.
 (HIGH) The cook was one of the top entries in an individual challenge, but didn't win.
 (IN) The cook wasn't selected as a top or bottom entry in an individual challenge.
 (IN) The cook wasn't selected as a top or bottom entry in a team challenge.
 (IMM) The cook didn't have to compete in that round of the competition and was safe from elimination.
 (PT) The cook was on the losing team in the Team challenge and competed in the Pressure test.
 (NPT) The cook was on the losing team in the Team challenge, did not compete in the Pressure test, and advanced.
 (RET) The cook won the Reinstation Challenge and returned to the competition.
 (LOW) The cook was one of the bottom entries in an individual challenge, but wasn't the last person to advance.
 (LOW) The cook was one of the bottom entries in an individual challenge, and the last person to advance.
 (LOW) The cook was one of the bottom entries in the Team challenge and they were the only person from their team to advance.
 (LOW) The cook was one of the bottom entries in the Team challenge, and their team was last to advance.
 (JOIN) The cook was originally eliminated but invited back in the competition.
 (ELIM) The cook was eliminated from MasterChef.

Episodes

Episode 1
 Original airdate: Sunday 4 February 2018
 Basic Cooking Skills: The 30 contestants competed must show the basic skills in the kitchen by using a knife to chop the pork. And use that minced pork for the main ingredient to cook the food in 60 minutes. In this round have bottom 5 that had to eliminate. The other 25 continued to next round.
 Eliminated: Kunjafar, Roam, Tum, Zai, and Pleum
 Cooking Skills: The other 25 contestants have to compete in round 2 in which the main ingredient is Macrobrachium rosenbergii and each person can use only 2 Macrobrachium rosenbergii for cooking in 60 minutes. Bank, Annie, Prae, Tong, First, Bo, Kapom, Pung, Golf, Yuri, Pimm and Min automatically continue to the next round. The other 12 people, the Judges will taste all 12 people's dishes again. After that, Miang, Mo Tum, Deaw, Lat, Aim, Belle, and Jon were able to continue to next round.
 Eliminated: Mos, Yo, Baowhiw, Namtarn, and June

Episode 2
 Original airdate: Sunday 11 February 2018
 Mystery Box Challenge 1: The contestants had to prepare a dish using only the Mystery Box ingredients, that the main ingredient is Pla ra. And the other ingredients are pork belly, dried shrimp, wet tamarind, Raspberry, Japanese cucumber, bell pepper, Thai basil, Shallot, All-purpose flour, and Japanese rice.
The top 20 competed on their first mystery box challenge where Tum, Min, and Bo were called out to have 3 stand out dishes, unfortunately, those dishes stood out in bad ways and bad enough to send one of them home on the spot.

 Bottom three: Tum, Min and Bo
Tum was saved from elimination. Bo was sent home, leaving Min to be sent to safety
 Eliminated: Bo
The judges then declare one winner for the mystery box challenge and the winner is Miang
 Winner/Immune: Miang
 Invention Test 1
Miang got immunity from elimination and she got to choose for what the rest of the contestants would cook for their elimination challenge. She got the choice between: Cupcakes, Tarts and Doughnuts. She chose tarts. Miang also got to choose 4 home cooks to be saved as well. She chooses to save: Tong, Yuri, Belle, and Jon
 Immune: Tong, Yuri, Belle, and Jon
The unsafe contestants had to create a box of tarts that have 12 tarts 4 flavors and Lat and Deaw were declared as the top 2 of that challenge and are team captains of the next team challenge.
 Top two: Lat and Deaw
Deaw was declared the winner
 Winner: Deaw
Pung, Pimm, and Min had the worst dishes of this challenge
 Bottom three: Pung, Pimm, and Min
Pung was sent to safety. Pimm was eliminated from the competition sending Min to safety
 Eliminated: Pimm

Episode 3
 Original airdate: Sunday 18 February 2018
 Team Challenge 1
The top 18 home cooks were sent to their first team challenge where they went to a shrine to serve Chinese food for Ah Kong R-Mar for 201 peoples. Each team must serve 1 dish of Chinese entrée food and 1 dish of desserts. They have time to cooking for 90 minutes and 60 minutes more to serve.

 Winner Team: Blue
 Pressure Test 1: For the pressure test, the Red team is the lost team, But The captain can choose 3 people to get immune for the pressure test. Captain choose First, Belle, Miang. But Miang gives the immune to Deaw (Captain). For the pressure test. People who not got immune have 50 minutes to cook Unadon.
 Immune: First, Belle and Deaw
 Bottom three: Tum, Tong, and Miang
 Eliminated: Tong

Episode 4
 Original airdate: Sunday 25 February 2018
 Mystery Box Challenge 2: The contestants had to prepare a dish using only the Mystery Box ingredients, that the main ingredient is the T-bone part Angus cattle from Australia. And the other ingredients are Scallop, Potato, Wonton sheet, Brussels sprout, Strawberry, Bird's eye chili, Mozzarella cheese, chicken egg, Eatable flower and salted crab. The contestants have 60 minutes to cook the dishes. Golf and Aim were the bottom two and got blame by the judges. Deaw, Bank and Jah were the top three. Jah won and got the privilege to control the invention test.
 Bottom two: Golf and Aim
 Winner/Immune: Jah
 Invention Test 2: Since Jah got the privilege to control the invention test. Jah got immune and can choose who to cook Entrée dish or to cook desserts. By peoples who got devil dolls have to cook desserts and peoples who didn't get have to cook Entrée dish. People who got devil dolls are Kapom, Jon, Deaw, Belle, Bank, Pung, First and Lat. The ingredient to compete in this round is a different kind of Solanaceae and have 60 minutes to cook the dish. Lat and First were the Best and they'll be Captain team in the next competition.
 Winner: Lat
Jon, Aim and Belle had the worst dishes of this challenge
 Bottom three: Jon, Aim and Belle
 Eliminated: Aim

Episode 5
 Original airdate: Sunday 4 March 2018
 Team Challenge 2
The top 16 home cooks were sent to their second team challenge where they went to an IMPACT Lakeside to serve street food and desserts for Motorbikes driver for 251 peoples. Each team must serve 1 dish of entrée street food and 1 dish of desserts. They have time to cooking for 90 minutes and 60 minutes more to serve.

The blue team with a score of 179 scores. And the red team got only 72 scores.
 Winner Team: Blue
 Pressure Test 2: For the pressure test, the Red team is the lost team, But The captain of the winning team (First) can choose 4 people to get immune for the pressure test. First choose Kapom, Tum, Bank, and Min. For the pressure test, people who not got immune have to cook 3 different menus of an egg, Which have 3 rounds. A person who can do the best in each round will get immune.
 Immune: Kapom, Tum, Bank, and Min
 Round 1: The contestants who not got immune have to cook the poached egg within 10 minutes. Lat can do the best in round 1 so she got immune for the next round.
 Round 1 Winner/Immune: Lat
 Round 2: The other 3 people have to cook the perfect fried egg within 7 minutes. Jah can do the best in round 2 so she got immune for the last round.
 Round 2 Winner/Immune: Jah
 Round 3: The other 2 people have to cook the omu egg on top of the rice that already prepared within 5 minutes. Golf could do better than Prae so that Golf could go to the next round. Prae got eliminated
 Eliminated: Prae

Episode 6
 Original airdate: Sunday 11 March 2018
 Mystery Box Challenge 3: The contestants had to prepare a dish using only the Mystery Box ingredients, that the main ingredient is Tako octopus which is the most expensive octopus in the world. And the other ingredients are Mirin, Purple cauliflower, Shoyu, Japanese Scallion, Red bean, All-purpose flour, Persimmon, Yuzu juice and Algae. The contestants have 60 minutes to cook the dishes. First, bank and Kapom were the top three. Kapom won and got the privilege to control the invention test.
 Top three: First, Bank and Kapom
 Winner/Immune: Kapom
 Invention Test 3: Since Kapom got the privilege to control the invention test. Kapom got immune and can choose the main ingredient to other contestants. The main ingredient is in a group of Local Thai ingredients. Which have Clarias, Wild boar, and backyard chickens. Kapom chooses backyard chickens to Golf, Jah, Tum, and Jon. Choose clarias to Lat, Miang, Pung, Belle, and Annie. Choose Wild boar to Bank, Deaw, Yuri, First and Min. Every contestant has 60 minutes to cook the dishes. Lat, Belle, First and Jah were the top four of this invention test.
 Winner: Jah

Jon and Golf had the worst dishes of this challenge because the main ingredient of both dishes still raw so that the judges can't taste these dishes.
 Bottom two: Jon and Golf
 Eliminated: Jon

Episode 7
 Original airdate: Sunday 18 March 2018
 Team Challenge 3
The top 14 home cooks were sent to their third team challenge where they went to Hard Yao, Chonburi to serve food in condition of "Food that gives energy and stays full" that contains Proteins 50%, flavor 25%, and vegetables 25% for 501 boy scout and girl guide which age about 13–15 years old. Each team has time to cooking for 90 minutes and 60 minutes more to serve. Red team didn't serve 24 dishes to girl guide because the time had run out.

Blue team got a score of 347 scores while the red team got a score of 154 scores so that the blue team wins.

 Winner Team: Blue
 Pressure Test 3: For the pressure test, the Red team is the lost team. And have 45 minutes to cook Bánh xèo in palace people receipt.
 Bottom three: Kapom, First And Pung
 Eliminated: Pung

Episode 8
 Original airdate: Sunday 25 March 2018
 Mystery Box Challenge 4: The contestants had to prepare a dish using only the Mystery Box ingredients, that the main ingredient is Sweetened condensed milk and other ingredients are apple, banana, soybean, hazelnut, butter, pandan, honey, vanilla pods, chocolates, berry and cream cheese with the condition of Desserts
 Top three: Jah, Bank, and Lat
 Winner/Immune: Bank
 Invention Test 4:  Since the Bank won the mystery box challenge, Bank got immune can he can choose ingredients to other contestants which are in a group of "The best ingredients of the world". Which are Kobe A5 beef, Canadian lobster, and Sea cucumber. Bank choose sea cucumber to Annie, First, Belle and Kapom, choose Canadian lobster to Golf, Miang, Jah and Yuri and choose Kobe A5 beef to Tum, Min, Lat, and Deaw. Everyone has 60 minutes to cook the dish.
 Bottom three: Deaw, Miang, and Annie
 Eliminated: Annie

Episode 9
 Original airdate: Sunday 1 April 2018
 Team Challenge 4 (Dual) In this round, the competition will be in dual. And for the menu to cook in this round is " Set of Dim sum". That has 5 types total of 16 pieces. Which are pork shumai, shrimp shumai, Foie gras Har gow, Haliotis Dim sum and shrimp with sesame. Which have Chef Pom Thanaruk Chuto demonstrates how to cook this of Dim sum. This competition has 90 minutes to cook this Dim sum and each person has 15 minutes to cook and switch with another person in the pair when heard the signal from judges. Since Min won last week competition, Min can choose the pair for others and herself. She paired Yuri and Belle, Jah and Kapom, Golf and Bank, First and Tum, Deaw and Miang and Min choose Lat for their own pair. After the judges taste all the pair of Dim sum, pair of Yuri and Belle couldn't serve all pieces of Dim sum and they couldn't work with a team as well. This made Yuri and Belle send to pressure test.
 Pressure Test 4 Since the pair of Yuri and Belle couldn't work with a team as well. They must do the pressure test, Which is competition one by one. And for the menu to cook for pressure test is "Medium rare jumbo steak" serve with mashed potato and fried onion flower shaped. Each person has 40 minutes to cook this menu. After the judges taste Belle and Yuri dishes, both couldn't cook mashed potato and fried onion flower shaped as well. But Yuri could cook Jumbo steak to medium rare level, but Belle cook just only a rare level. This made Belle eliminated.
 Eliminated: Belle

Episode 10
 Original airdate: Sunday 8 April 2018
 Team Challenge 5 In this team challenges, the judges chose Yuri, Golf and Tum, who to date did not win any mystery box challenges or invention tests, to be team captains. Other contestants had to run to the captain team. Jah and Bank choose Golf. And Lat, Min, Minag, Deaw, First and Kapom choose Yuri and no one chooses Tum. Tum was dissolved into Team Golf. Yuri sent Kapom to Team Golf to make the teams more balanced.

For this Team Challenge, all contestants were taken to House No.1, where two teams had to cook a course of authentic ancient Thai food to 61 noble descendants, bearing honorifics of Mom Rajawongse, Mom Luang, those bearing na Ayudhya family titles, as well as other members of the nobility. Since the nobility had access to highly refined Thai cuisine and some families may also have their own culinary styles, the judges were highly familiar with authentic Thai cuisine. This made the challenge particularly demanding on both teams. Some of the guests were particular on the balance of flavors presented in the plate.

Both teams had 120 minutes to cook the entrees and desserts and 60 minutes to serve. The blue team failed to serve 17 desserts because the time had run out, but still emerged victorious with 40-21 votes.

 Winner team/Immune: Blue team
 Pressure test 5: In this pressure test, the red team was which lost the earlier challenge will have their worst 2 contestants eliminated. The theme was egg sausage in dried red curry. All contestants in the red team had 1 hour and 15 minutes to cook this menu.
 Bottom three: Miang, Min, and Deaw
 Eliminated: Miang and Min

Episode 11
 Original airdate: Sunday 15 April 2018
 The remaining contestants making food by Masterchef Kitchen.
 Bottom two: Golf and Kapom
 Eliminated: Golf

Episode 12
 Original airdate: Sunday 22 April 2018
 Team Challenge 6

After the team challenge, the Blue team won which made them all immune from elimination.

 Bottom three: First and Kapom
 Eliminated: Kapom

Episode 13
 Original airdate: Sunday 29 April 2018
 The remaining contestant making by MasterChef Kitchen.
 Bottom two: Lat and Yuri
 Eliminated: Yuri

Episode 14
 Original airdate: Sunday 6 May 2018
 Team Challenge 7

After the team challenge, the Red team won which made them all immune from elimination.

 Tum is eliminated.
 Bottom two: Bank and Tum
 Eliminated: Tum

Episode 15
 Original airdate: Sunday 13 May 2018
 Mystery Box Challenge
 Top Three : Deaw, Jah, Lat
 Winner : Jah
 Invention Test : Jah won the Mystery Box and was allowed to pick the theme of the Invention Test, from three national themes (Italian, Japanese and Indian). However, she was not given immunity. Jah picked Italian for herself and Indian for the other contestants, commenting that she preferred to "challenge herself." This act of self-challenge backfired as Jah was eliminated, along with Bank.
 Eliminated: Bank and Jah

Episode 16
 Original airdate: Sunday 20 May 2018
 Challenge Winners: Lat
 Pressure Test : Deaw and First 
 Eliminated: Deaw

In this "fine dining" challenge, six previously eliminated contestants (Bank, Golf, Jah, Kapom, Tum, Yuri) were invited to become sous-chefs of the three standing. Drafting was done by drawing lots.

The food was served to thirty Michelin Star and Michelin Plate chefs, making the episode one of the largest congregations of professional chefs in the show's history. Lat won the first contest and advanced to the Finale, leaving the other two to fight for survival.

The Pressure Test was a course of two plates, consisting of "Salmon Steak with Hollandaise Sauce" and "Churros, Chocolate Mousse, and Passion Fruit Dome". Both highly precise and particular plates were to be made from scratch, i.e. steak made from filleting the fish, sauce from beating egg and butter, and so on. After a narrow 3-2 decision (points based on judges' collective criteria, see table below), Deaw was eliminated at the end of the day.

Episode 17
 Original airdate: Sunday 27 May 2018
 MasterChef Thailand Winner: First

This episode consists of a head-to-head duel on a three-course meal with an appetizer, a main course, and a dessert. Both contestants, coming from the Northern region, decided to use their regional specialties. The three chefs served as judges. All previously eliminated contestants were invited as an audience.

References

2018 Thai television seasons
MasterChef Thailand